Berryville Historic District is a national historic district located at Berryville, Clarke County, Virginia. It encompasses 313 contributing buildings and 1 contributing object in the town of Berryville. They include a variety of residential, commercial, and industrial buildings dating from the late 18th century to the 1930s.  Notable buildings include the Treadwell Smith House (Hawthorne Hall) (c. 1820), Sarah Stribling House (Battletown Inn) (c. 1810), Crow's Nest (1830s), Berryville Presbyterian Church (c. 1854), Grace Episcopal Church (1857), Coiner's Department Store (c. 1896), Clarke Milling Company (now
Custom Millwork, Inc.), H. W. Baker Grain Warehouse (now Berryville Farm Supply), H. B. Whiting Brothers Warehouse, Berryville railroad depot (1910), the First National Bank (c. 1910), the Farmers and Merchants National Bank (c. 1930), and the U.S. Post Office (1938).  The contributing object is the Clarke County Confederate Memorial on the grounds of the courthouse. Located in the district and separately listed is the Old Clarke County Courthouse.

It was listed on the National Register of Historic Places in 1987.

See also

 Long Marsh Run Rural Historic District

References

Historic districts in Clarke County, Virginia
National Register of Historic Places in Clarke County, Virginia
Historic districts on the National Register of Historic Places in Virginia